George Douglas Wise (June 4, 1831 – February 4, 1908) was an American slave owner, white supremacist, and U.S. Representative from Virginia. He was nephew of Henry Alexander Wise, and cousin of John Sergeant Wise and Richard Alsop Wise.

Biography
Wise was the son of Tully Robinson and Margaret Douglas Pettitt (Wise) Wise, who were double second cousins.  He was born at "Deep Creek," the Wise estate in Accomack County, near Onancock, Virginia, Wise was graduated from Indiana University at Bloomington.
He studied law in the College of William and Mary, Williamsburg, Virginia.
He was admitted to the bar and commenced practice in Richmond, Virginia.
He served as captain in the Confederate States Army during the Civil War.
He was Commonwealth's attorney of the city of Richmond from 1870 to 1889, when he resigned.

Wise was elected as a Democrat to the Forty-seventh and to the three succeeding Congresses (March 4, 1881 – March 3, 1889).
He served as chairman of the Committee on Manufactures (Forty-ninth Congress).
Presented credentials as a Member-elect to the Fifty-first Congress and served from March 4, 1889, to April 10, 1890, when he was succeeded by Edmund Waddill, Jr., who contested his election.

Wise embraced ideas of a master race, once telling the House of Representatives that "if I could I would not have the mingling of Caucasian blood with that of any inferior race." He referred to Chinese immigrants as "this indigestible mass . . . inferior in mental and moral qualities . . .  a continual menace to the existence of republican institutions.”

Wise was elected to the Fifty-second and Fifty-third Congresses (March 4, 1891 – March 3, 1895).
He served as chairman of the committee on Interstate and Foreign Commerce (Fifty-second and Fifty-third Congresses). Wise was a delegate to the Virginia Constitutional Convention of 1901-1902.
He died in Richmond, Virginia, February 4, 1908.
He was interred in Hollywood Cemetery.

Electoral history

1880; Wise was elected to the U.S. House of Representatives with 55.94% of the vote, defeating Readjuster John Sergeant Wise and Republican H.L. Pelonze.
1882; Wise was re-elected with 57.12% of the vote, defeating Readjuster John Ambler Smith.
1884; Wise was re-elected with 52.4% of the vote, defeating Republican Robert T. Hubbard.
1886; Wise was re-elected with 52.73% of the vote, defeating Republican Edmund Waddill, Jr.
1888; Wise was re-elected with 50.42% of the vote, however the results were contested and Republican Waddill, Jr. was seated.
1890; Wise was re-elected unopposed.
1892; Wise was re-elected with 63.94% of the vote, defeating Republican Walter E. Grant.

References

Sources

External links

 

Manuscript Civil War Diary of Confederate soldier George D. Wise  (Morristown and Morris Township Public Library, N.J.) 

1831 births
1908 deaths
Virginia lawyers
Delegates to Virginia Constitutional Convention of 1901
20th-century American politicians
Burials at Hollywood Cemetery (Richmond, Virginia)
Confederate States Army officers
Democratic Party members of the United States House of Representatives from Virginia
19th-century American politicians
Wise family of Virginia